Podpeč nad Marofom is a small settlement west of Planina pri Sevnici in the Municipality of Šentjur, eastern Slovenia. The settlement, and the entire municipality, are included in the Savinja Statistical Region, which is in the Slovenian portion of the historical Duchy of Styria.

Name
The name of the settlement was changed from Podpeč to Podpeč nad Marofom in 1953.

References

External links
Podpeč nad Marofom at Geopedia

Populated places in the Municipality of Šentjur